Nepenthes blancoi may refer to:

Nepenthes blancoi Blume (1852) — synonym of N. alata (after neotypification)
Nepenthes blancoi auct. non Blume:  Macfarl. (1908); Macfarl. (1927) — synonym of N. abalata

blancoi